Italia Viva (IV) is a liberal political party in Italy founded in September 2019. The party is led by Matteo Renzi, a former Prime Minister of Italy and former secretary of the Democratic Party (PD). Italia Viva is a member of the European Democratic Party, alongside its associated party Action.

History

Background 
Matteo Renzi started his political career in the Italian People's Party (PPI), a Christian-democratic party, and was elected president of the Province of Florence in 2004. Through The Daisy party he joined the Democratic Party in 2007 and was elected Mayor of Florence in 2009. A frequent critic of his party's leadership, especially under Pier Luigi Bersani, Renzi made his name as il Rottamatore, in English the Scrapper or the Demolisher (of old leaders and ideas), for his advocacy of complete change in the party, as well as a reformer and a moderniser. His followers were known as Renziani.

Speculations over a new party led by Renzi date back to 2012, when he was defeated by Bersani in the run-off of the centre-left primary election. Rumors stopped when Renzi was elected secretary of the PD in December 2013. He also became Prime Minister in February 2014. He led the party to huge electoral success in the 2014 European Parliament election (40.8%), but badly lost the 2016 Italian constitutional referendum (59.1% to 40.9%), which caused his resignation as Prime Minister.

After the PD's defeat in the 2018 general election, in which the PD only gained 18.7% of vote, forcing Renzi to resign as secretary, rumours of a split emerged. In March 2019 Nicola Zingaretti, a social democrat and a prominent member of the party's left-wing who had roots in the Italian Communist Party, won the leadership election by a landslide, defeating Maurizio Martina (Renzi's former deputy secretary) and Roberto Giachetti (supported by most Renziani). Zingaretti focused his campaign on a clear contrast with Renzi's policies and, according to pundits, his victory opened the way for a major shift in the character of the Democratic Party.

In August 2019, tensions grew within the coalition supporting Giuseppe Conte's first government, leading to a motion of no-confidence by the League. Despite having opposed it in the past, Renzi advocated the formation of a new government between the PD and the populist Five Star Movement (M5S). After days of tensions within the PD, on 28 August, Zingaretti announced his support for a new government with the M5S, led by Conte. The Conte II Cabinet was sworn in on 5 September, and Renzi was seen by many as the real kingmaker of the new parliamentary majority.

Foundation 

On 16 September, in an interview to la Repubblica, Renzi announced his intention to leave the PD and create new parliamentary groups. On the same day, interviewed by Bruno Vespa during the late-night TV talk-show Porta a Porta, he officially launched Italia Viva. In the interview he also confirmed his support for Conte's government. Renzi was initially followed by 24 deputies and 12 senators from the PD, notably including Maria Elena Boschi, Roberto Giachetti, Teresa Bellanova (Minister of Agriculture) and Elena Bonetti (Minister of Family and Equal Opportunities). Three more senators, Donatella Conzatti, Riccardo Nencini and Gelsomina Vono, joined respectively from Forza Italia (FI), the Italian Socialist Party (PSI) and M5S, while one deputy, Gabriele Toccafondi, joined from Popular Civic List (CP).

The split was condemned by the PD's leadership: Zingaretti described it as a "mistake", while Dario Franceschini called it a "big problem". Beppe Grillo, founder of the M5S, described Renzi's actions as "an act of narcissism". Prime Minister Conte declared his perplexity too, saying that Renzi "should have informed [him] before the birth of the government". Additionally, Il Foglio revealed that internet domains italiaviva.eu and italiaviva.org were created on 9 August 2019, hinting that the split had been prepared in advance. The following day, la Repubblica revealed that the domains were bought by Alessandro Risso, a former member of Christian Democracy and the PPI from Piedmont. However, Risso explained that his moves had nothing to do with Renzi, whom he opposed.

Italia Viva's backbone was largely based on the Committees of Civil Action of Back to the Future, launched by Renzi during the 2018 Leopolda convention in Florence and seen by some people as the initial step of a new party. Ettore Rosato, the organiser of the committees, and Bellanova were appointed party's coordinators.

In October, during the Leopolda annual convention, the logo of IV was unveiled. It featured a stylised seagull and was chosen by supporters in an online vote.

Road to the 2022 general election 
In February, Nicola Danti, IV member and MEP, left the Progressive Alliance of Socialists and Democrats group and joined the Renew Europe group. A few days before, Sandro Gozi, a former member of the PD's national board who later joined IV, had been sworn in as member of the European Parliament for France (elected with Renaissance list, formed largely by members of La République En Marche) and became the party's second MEP.

In January 2021 IV withdrew its support for Conte's second government, triggering a political crisis. Conte subsequently won confidence motions in both houses of Parliament, with the abstention of IV, but could only reach a plurality in the Senate, rather than an absolute majority. In the wake of this, Conte tendered his resignation to President Mattarella, who then began a round of discussions with various parties to form a new government. Consequently, IV was instrumental in the formation of Mario Draghi's government, in which minister Bonetti was confirmed.

In December 2021, IV joined the European Democratic Party.

In the run-up of the 2022 general election the party, which refused to join, or was refused entry to, the PD-led centre-left coalition, joined forces with the National Civic List (put forward by Federico Pizzarotti of Italia in Comune and Piercamillo Falasca of L'Italia c'è) and the Italian Republican Party (PRI). Most importantly, IV formed a joint electoral list with Carlo Calenda's Action.

Ideology 

Italia Viva is considered a liberal and reformist party. Its "Charter of Values", presented in October 2019, referred to republican and anti-fascist values expressed in the Constitution of Italy, as well as in the Charter of Fundamental Rights of the European Union and the Universal Declaration of Human Rights. The movement also emphasised the principle of gender equality, the relaunch of globalisation and a strong opposition to all forms of protectionism and souverainism. It also supported a more incisive European political and economic integration, with the direct election of the President of the European Commission and the introduction of transnational lists.

Renzi described his party as a "young, innovative and feminist house, where new ideas for Italy and Europe are launched."

Renzi has likened IV to Emmanuel Macron's La République En Marche! (REM).

Electoral results

Italian Parliament

Regional Councils

Leadership 
 Leader: Matteo Renzi (2019–present)
 President: Teresa Bellanova (2019–present), Ettore Rosato (2019–present)
 Party leader in the Chamber of Deputies: Maria Elena Boschi (2019–present)
 Party leader in the Senate: Davide Faraone (2019–present)

See also 
 Back to the Future (Italy)
 Reformist Base
 Renziani

References

External links 
 Civic Action Committees official website 

2019 establishments in Italy
Centre-left parties in Europe
Centrist parties in Italy
Liberal parties in Italy
Social liberal parties
Democratic Party (Italy) breakaway groups
Political parties established in 2019